Milt's Stop & Eat is a restaurant in Moab, Utah. It is a walk-up style eatery that also features dine-in service. The restaurant was founded in 1954, during the emergence of fast food restaurants in the United States, and is the oldest restaurant in the city. Milt's Stop & Eat serves fast-food staples.

History 

Four blocks off of Main Street in Moab, Utah, Milt's Stop & Eat was open by Milt and Audrey Galbraith in September 1954. The Galbraiths moved to Moab during the town’s uranium boom and opened their restaurant the same year. It is the oldest restaurant in the city and has largely remained the same as it was in 1954.

Milt's was owned by the Galbraiths for over 27 years, and the couple continued to eat there until Milt Galbraith's death in 2014.  Nellie Balangee and her husband BC Laprade bought the diner in 2007, and introduced buffalo burgers to the menu.

References

External links
Official site

Restaurants in Utah
Fast-food restaurants
1954 establishments in Utah